Murder the Mountains is the debut studio album by the American stoner metal band Red Fang, released in 2011. Music videos were released for the songs "Wires" and "Hank Is Dead".

Track listing
All tracks written by Red Fang, except where noted.

Critical reception

Reviews of Murder the Mountains were positive, with repeated admiration for the heaviness of their riffs and parts. Different influences were noted by reviewers, ranging from proto-metal to punk to sludge.

Use in media
The song "Number Thirteen" was a playable song in the video game Rocksmith. "Wires" was a playable song in the follow-up game Rocksmith 2014.

Wires was played in episode 211 of the Canadian show Todd and the Book of Pure Evil.

Personnel
Red Fang
Maurice Bryan Giles - guitars, vocals
Aaron Beam - bass, vocals
David Sullivan - guitars
John Sherman - drums

Additional musicians
Anita Robinson - guitars
Kevin Robinson - percussion, effects
Jenny Conlee - organ
Chris Funk - slide guitar, percussion

Production
Orion Landau - artwork
Kevin Robinson - recording
Adam Selzer - recording
Chris Funk - producer
Mike Rooney - assistant mixing
Vance Pawell - mixing
Carl Saff - mastering

References

2011 albums
Red Fang albums
Relapse Records albums